Epaminonda Lucaciu (February 25, 1877 - July 29, 1960) was a Romanian Greek Catholic priest who was the first Romanian priest sent to the United States of America.

Life 
The son of Vasile Lucaciu, Epaminonda Lucaciu received a scholarship to study at the Pontificio Collegio Urbano de Propaganda Fide Fide in Rome, Italy.

On the 19th of November 1905, Lucaciu established Saint Helena Romanian Byzantine Catholic Church. Lucaciu served at the parish until 1907.

References 

Romanian Greek-Catholic priests
Saint George's in Canton
Romanian Austro-Hungarians
People from Satu Mare County
1877 births
1960 deaths